The Argentine legislative elections of 1960 was held on 27 March. Voters chose their legislators, and with a turnout of 87%.

Background
President Arturo Frondizi had been elected in 1958 largely with the endorsement of the exiled, populist leader, Juan Perón. Military and conservative pressure made the president unable to lift the 1955 ban imposed on Peronism - though Peronists had other reasons for breaking with Frondizi ahead of the 1960 elections. Contrary to his platform, he appointed ultra-conservative economist Alvaro Alsogaray, whose austerity program helped lead to a doubling of prices in 1959 (a record, up to that time) and sharp recession. Recommending the casting of blank votes, Perón took care to deprive Frondizi of potential anti-peronist support by revealing their earlier, secret deal: Peronist support in 1958 in exchange for restored political rights. A year marked with labor strife was followed by the bombing of a Shell Petroleum facility in March 1960, leading to the enactment of the Conintes Plan - a further, severe limitation on political freedoms.

Frondizi bore the brunt of public disapproval over these developments; in reality, however, both decisions were signed on the insistence of the Argentine military, many of whom were unambiguous on their willingness to overthrow the president (Conintes, in particular was signed in lieu of military demands for martial law). Frondizi's UCRI congressional candidates went from nearly half the 1958 vote to only 27% - though they retained their overall majority since its loss of seats was more moderate (mostly to Ricardo Balbín's more conservative UCR-P). Peronists' blank votes resulted in one of the highest such incidences (25%) in Argentine electoral history.

Results

Results by province

References

1960
1960 elections in Argentina
March 1960 events in South America